Hairy vetch is a common name for several plants and may refer to:

Vicia hirsuta
Vicia sativa
Vicia villosa, native to Europe and western Asia